The Cambridge and Concord Turnpike was an early turnpike between Cambridge and Concord, Massachusetts. Portions have been incorporated into today's Massachusetts Route 2; the remainder forms other major local roads.

Route description 
The turnpike began at the western end of the West Boston Bridge in Cambridgeport (now Kendall Square). ((Today's sharp turn after crossing Pleasant Street in Belmont Center was a revision to the original turnpike, as its original path directly up the hill ahead proved too difficult for transportation. The earlier route still exists as Centre Ave.) The turnpike continued through Lincoln in a direct line to Concord Center. Today one section forms part of Route 2 (from Route 128 to Bypass Road); the other continues into Concord as Cambridge Turnpike.

History 
The Cambridge and Concord Turnpike Corporation was established on March 7-8, 1803, by act of the Massachusetts legislature. In 1805-06 most of the turnpike was constructed in very nearly a straight line from Cambridge to Concord Center, despite the needless difficulties this entailed with steep hills along the selected path. (After construction, the route was somewhat modified to improve its practicality.) Much of the road opened for business in February 1807, though the eastern segment within Cambridge was not completed until circa 1812.

No gates were erected within Cambridge, as a result of a lawsuit.

The turnpike was not an economic success, and in May 1829 it was converted to a public highway. Its poor profits were probably due to the uncompromising "straight line" route, which both impeded traffic by needless steep hills and bypassed the important town of Lexington.

References 

 Cambridge and Concord Turnpike Corporation, Act of incorporation of the Cambridge & Concord Turnpike, passed March 7, 1803 also, the bye laws of the same, printed by Samuel Etheridge, Charlestown [Mass.], 1803.
 A. Bradford Smith, "The Concord Turnpike", in Proceedings of the Lexington Historical Society, Lexington Historical Society, Lexington, Massachusetts, 1905. Vol. III, pages 110-116.
 Frederic James Wood, The Turnpikes of New England and Evolution of the Same Through England, Virginia, and Maryland, Boston: Marshall Jones Company, 1919. Page 122.

See also 
 19th-century turnpikes in Massachusetts

Streets in Cambridge, Massachusetts
Concord, Massachusetts
History of Massachusetts
Roads in Massachusetts
Pre-freeway turnpikes in the United States